The 2017 Super Rugby season was the 22nd season of Super Rugby, an annual rugby union competition organised by SANZAAR between teams from Argentina, Australia, Japan, New Zealand and South Africa. It was the second season featuring an expanded 18-team format, following the competition's expansion from 15 teams prior to the 2016 season.

After 17 rounds of matches between 23 February and 15 July – with Rounds 15 and 16 split due to the 2017 mid-year rugby union internationals and British & Irish Lions tour to New Zealand – four conference winners and four wildcard teams progressed to the finals series, which will consist of quarterfinals, semifinals and a final on 5 August.

Competition format

The 18 participating teams were divided into two geographical groups, each consisting of two conferences: the Australasian Group, with five teams in the Australian Conference and five teams in the New Zealand Conference, and the South African Group, with six South African teams, one Argentine team and one Japanese team split into two four-team conferences – an Africa 1 Conference and an Africa 2 Conference.

In the group stages, there were 17 rounds of matches, where each team played 15 matches and had two rounds of byes for a total of 135 matches. Due to the British & Irish Lions tour to New Zealand in June and July, Rounds 15 and 16 were split; Round 15 of the Australian and New Zealand Conferences were played on the weekend of 3 June, with Round 16 of the New Zealand Conference scheduled for the following week. The South African Conference Round 15 matches were played on the weekend of 1 July, with the Round 16 matches for the Australian and South African conferences scheduled for a week later.

Teams played six intra-conference matches; in the four-team African Conferences, each team played the other three teams in their conference at home and away, while in the five-team Australasian Conferences, each team played two teams home and away and once against the other two teams (one at home and one away). The other nine matches were a single round of matches against each team in the other conference in their group, as well as against each team from one of the conferences in the other group. For 2017, the teams in Africa 1 played the teams in the New Zealand Conference, while the teams in Africa 2 played the teams in the Australian Conference.

The top team in each of the four conferences qualified for the quarterfinals. The next three highest-ranked teams in the Australasian Group and the next highest-ranked team in the South African group also qualified to the quarterfinals as wildcards. The conference winners were seeded #1 to #4 for the quarterfinals, in order of log points gained during the group stages, while the wildcards were seeded as #5 to #8 in order of log points gained during the group stages.

In the quarterfinals, the conference winners hosted the first round of the finals, with the highest-seeded conference winner hosting the fourth-seeded wildcard entry, the second-seeded conference winner hosting the third-seeded wildcard entry, the third-seeded conference winner hosting the second-seeded wildcard entry and the fourth-seeded conference winner hosting the top-seed wildcard entry.

The quarterfinal winners progressed to the semifinals. Instead of the following the Shaughnessy playoff format used from 1996 to 2016, the semi-finals were drawn according to a predetermined bracket. Under the new format, the winner of Quarter-final 1 (which featured the highest-seeded conference winner and the lowest-seeded wildcard) will play the winner of Quarter-final 4 (which featured the fourth-seeded conference winner and the highest-seeded wildcard) and likewise with the winners of Quarter-finals 2 and 3. The two semi-final hosts were the highest-seeded winners of their respective quarter-finals.

The winners of the semifinals advanced to the final, at the venue of the highest-seeded team.

Changes for 2018

On 9 April 2017, SANZAAR announced that the competition would return to a 15-team format for 2018, with two teams from South Africa and one team from Australia being dropped. To ensure five-team conferences, Japanese side the  would move from the South African Conference to the Australian Conference.

Standings

Round-by-round

The table below shows each team's progression throughout the season. For each round, their cumulative points total is shown with the overall log position in brackets:

Matches

The fixtures for the 2017 Super Rugby competition were released on 20 September 2016. The following matches were played during the regular season:

Finals

The four conference winners advanced to the Quarter Finals, where they had home advantage against four wildcard teams, which consisted of the third to fifth-ranked teams in the Australasian Group and the third-ranked team in the South African Group.

The final seedings of these teams were:

The play-off fixtures were as follows:

Quarterfinals

Semifinals

Final

Players

Squads

The following squads were named for the 2017 Super Rugby season:

Referees

The following refereeing panel was appointed by SANZAAR for the 2017 Super Rugby season:

Attendances

References

External links
 Super Rugby websites:
 SANZAAR Super Rugby
 Australia Super Rugby
 New Zealand Super Rugby
 

 
2016
2017 in Argentine rugby union
2017 in Australian rugby union
2016–17 in Japanese rugby union
2017–18 in Japanese rugby union
2017 in New Zealand rugby union
2017 in South African rugby union
2017 rugby union tournaments for clubs